Lafayette Caskey (September 6, 1824 – October 5, 1881) was an American carpenter and politician.

Born in Canton Ohio, Caskey went to the public schools. In 1845, Caskey moved to Potosi, Grant County, Wisconsin Territory. He was a carpenter. In 1875, Caskey served in the Wisconsin State Assembly and was a Republican.

Notes

External links

1824 births
1881 deaths
Politicians from Canton, Ohio
People from Potosi, Wisconsin
American carpenters
Republican Party members of the Wisconsin State Assembly
19th-century American politicians